Hammonton (formerly, Dredgertown and Dredgerville) is an unincorporated community in Yuba County, California.

A post office operated at Hammonton from 1906 to 1957. The original name was due to gold dredging which took place in the nearby Yuba Goldfields. The current name is in honor of W.P. Hammon, gold-dredging company official.

References

Unincorporated communities in California
Populated places established in 1906
Unincorporated communities in Yuba County, California
1906 establishments in California